Events from the year 1598 in France

Incumbents
 Monarch – Henry IV

Events
April – signing of the Edict of Nantes.
2 May – Peace of Vervins

Births

Full date missing
Louis Phélypeaux, seigneur de La Vrillière, politician (d. 1681)
Helene Boullé (d. 1684)
Michel Villedo, stonemason, advisor and architect (d. 1667)

Deaths

Full date missing
Jean de Serres, historian (b. 1540)

See also

References

1590s in France